This is a list of seasons completed by the Delaware Fightin' Blue Hens football team of the National Collegiate Athletic Association (NCAA) Division I Football Championship Subdivision (FCS). Since the team's creation in 1889, the Fightin' Blue Hens have participated in more than 1,100 officially sanctioned games.

For most of its existence, Delaware competed as an independent. Delaware was a member of the Mason-Dixon Conference in 1946, the Middle Atlantic Conference from 1958 to 1969, the Yankee Conference from 1986 to 1996, the Atlantic 10 Conference from 1997 to 2006, and the Colonial Athletic Association beginning in 2007.

Seasons

Notes

References

Delaware Fightin' Blue Hens

Delaware Fightin' Blue Hens football seasons